Cape Verde elects on national level a head of state – the president – and a  legislature. The president is elected for a five-year term by the people. The National Assembly has 72 members, elected for a five-year term by proportional representation. Cape Verde has a two-party system, which means that there are two dominant political parties, with extreme difficulty for anybody to achieve electoral success under the banner of any other party.

Latest elections

2021 Parliamentary election

2016 Presidential election

See also
 2016 Cape Verdean local elections
 Electoral calendar
 Electoral system

External links
Adam Carr's Election Archive
African Elections Database